The County of Grenville is one of the 37 counties of Victoria which are part of the cadastral divisions of Australia, used for land titles. It is located to the north-east of Lake Corangamite and includes Cressy. Ballarat is on its north-eastern edge. The boundary to the east is the Yarrowee River, and to the south part of the Barwon River. Colac is on its southern edge. The county was proclaimed in 1849.

Parishes 
Parishes within the county:
 Argyle, Victoria
 Ballaarat, Victoria
 Bungaree, Victoria
 Cardigan, Victoria
 Carngham, Victoria
 Clarkesdale, Victoria
 Commeralghip, Victoria
 Corindhap, Victoria
 Cressy, Victoria
 Cundare, Victoria
 Dereel, Victoria
 Doroq, Victoria
 Dreeite, Victoria
 Enfield, Victoria
 Gellibrand, Victoria
 Haddon, Victoria
 Hesse, Victoria
 Karngun, Victoria
 Kurac-a-ruc, Victoria
 Lawaluk, Victoria
 Lynchfield, Victoria
 Mannibadar, Victoria
 Mindai, Victoria
 Mirnee, Victoria
 Mortchup, Victoria
 Murdeduke, Victoria
 Naringhil North, Victoria
 Naringhil South, Victoria
 Ondit, Victoria
 Poliah North, Victoria
 Poliah South, Victoria
 Poorneet, Victoria
 Scarsdale, Victoria
 Shelford, Victoria
 Shelford West, Victoria
 Smythesdale, Victoria
 Turkeeth, Victoria
 Wallinduc, Victoria
 Warracbarunah, Victoria
 Warrambine, Victoria
 Warrion, Victoria
 Weering, Victoria
 Wilgul North, Victoria
 Wilgul South, Victoria
 Windermere, Victoria
 Wingeel, Victoria
 Wurrook, Victoria
 Yarima, Victoria
 Yarrowee, Victoria

References
Vicnames, place name details
Research aids, Victoria 1910

Counties of Victoria (Australia)